, known by the stage name , was a Japanese actress and voice actress. Kazue was best known as the voice of Shoutarou Kaneda ("Jimmy Sparks") in Tetsujin 28-go ("Gigantor"). She debuted in 1949.

Kazue was also known for roles in Kaiju Booska and Sazae-san.

Kazue graduated from Kasei-Gakuin University.

In February 1998, she came down with myelodysplastic syndrome and was transported to the Bunkyo-ku Tokyo University hospital. Three days after her 70th birthday, Kazue died in the Bunkyo-ku Tokyo University hospital annex. She presumably died from bone marrow cancer.

In February 2010, she received a posthumous "Special Merit Award" from the 4th Seiyū Awards.

Voice roles

Anime 
Andersen Stories as Evil Queen, Kirt
 Akane-chan as Hidemaro
 Chibikko Remi to Meiken Kapi as Pepe
 Dokonjo Gaeru as Goro
 Doraemon (1973) as Suneo's Mother
 F as Sayuri
 Gauche the Cellist as Child tanuki
 Gegege no Kitaro Giant Robo as Rudo
 Tetsujin 28-go as Shoutarou Kaneda
 Kashi no Ki Mokku Katri, Girl of the Meadows as Gunilla
 Kikansha Yaemon D51 no Daiboken as Chuuko
 Steel Jeeg as Queen Himika & Mayumi Shiba 
 Kujira no Josephina as Josephina
 Dinosaur War Izenborg as Witch Zobina
 Kyoryu Tankentai Born Free as Masao Masaki
 Meiken Jolie Trider G7 as Okane
 Nagagutsu Sanjyuushi as Jane
 Ogon Bat as Takeru Yamato
 Osomatsu-kun as Chibita
 Phoenix 2772 as Pincho
 Sazae-san as Katsuo (2nd voice)
 Shin Mitsubachi Maaya no Boken as Thekla
 Moomin as Jane
 Tonde Mon Pe as Lady Kamata
 Brave Raideen Dub ALF as Raquel OchmonekAtom Ant as Atom Ant
The Magilla Gorilla Show as Magilla GorillaE.T. the Extra-Terrestrial as E.T. (VHS Dub)
 Tom and Jerry as one of the voices of Tom
 Suspiria as Miss Tanner (1979 TBS Dub)
 The Bugs Bunny Show as Bugs Bunny
 Daddy Long Legs as Alicia Pritchard (1970 TBS Dub)
 The Mirror Crack'd as Miss Marple (1983 TBS Dub)
 Johnny Dangerously as Ma Kelly (1991 NTV Dub)
 Willow as Queen Bavmorda (DVD Dub)
 The Glass Slipper as Widow Sonder (1969 NHK Dub)
 Witness for the Prosecution as Miss Plimsoll (1972 NET Dub)
 Every Which Way But Loose as Herb (1983 NTV Dub)
 Any Which Way You Can as Ma Boggs (1985 TV Asahi Dub)
 The Champ as Dolly Kenyon (1981 TV Asahi Dub)
 Deadly Friend as Elvira Parker (1990 TBS Dub)
 Bell, Book and Candle as Queenie Holroyd (1970 NET Dub)
 Strangers on a Train as Barbara Morton (1966 NET Dub)
 Murder by Death as Jessica Marbles (1981 TBS Dub)
 The Cheap Detective as Betty Deboop (1982 TBS Dub)
 Limelight as Mrs. Alsop (1977 TBS Dub)

Successors
Rica Matsumoto—E.T. the Extra Terrestrial as E.T.
Chisa Yokoyama—2112: The Birth of Doraemon, The Great Operating of Springing Insects as Yellow Doraemon
Miina Tominaga—Sazae-san as Katsuo Isono
Kazue Komiya—Columbo as Ms. Brady
Mami Horikoshi—Anpanman as Aunt Yarn Maki
Haruka Kudo—Anpanman as Enpitsuman
Yoshiko Asai—Super Robot Wars as Himika
Yasuhiro Takato—Booska! Booska! as Booska
Misato Okano—Flash the Booska'' as Booska

References

External links 
 
 

1929 births
1999 deaths
Deaths from cancer in Japan
Deaths from myelodysplastic syndrome
Deaths from multiple myeloma
Japanese voice actresses
Voice actresses from Tochigi Prefecture